The 1964 United States presidential election in California took place on November 3, 1964 as part of the 1964 United States presidential election. State voters chose 40 representatives, or electors, to the Electoral College, who voted for president and vice president.

California voted for the incumbent Democratic President, Lyndon B. Johnson of Texas, in a landslide over the Republican nominee, Senator Barry Goldwater of Arizona.

As Johnson won nationally in a massive landslide, taking 61.05% of the vote nationwide, and dominating many Northeastern and Midwestern states by record landslide margins, California weighed in at about 4% more Republican than the national average in the 1964 election. Johnson dominated in liberal Northern California, breaking 60% in many counties and even breaking 70% in Plumas County and the city of San Francisco. However, the Western conservative Goldwater, from neighboring Arizona, appealed to residents of conservative Southern California, where Johnson failed to break his nationwide vote average in a single county. Goldwater indeed won six congressional districts in suburban areas of Los Angeles, Orange, and San Diego counties, and carried two heavily populated Southern California counties outright: Orange County and San Diego County, thus holding Johnson below the 60% mark statewide. This is also the most recent Presidential election where Los Angeles County voted more Republican than the state as a whole. 

Although California has become a strongly Democratic state in recent elections, this was the only presidential election from 1952 to 1988 where the state was carried by a Democrat. Johnson is also the last Democrat to carry the counties of Calaveras, Colusa, Glenn, Kern, Modoc and Tulare, and the last to win the majority of the vote in Butte, El Dorado, Inyo, Kings, Mariposa, Siskiyou and Tuolumne counties, although one or more of Hubert Humphrey, Jimmy Carter, Bill Clinton, Barack Obama, and Joe Biden have won a plurality in those counties.

This was the last election in which California did not register the most votes cast by state. This was also Barry Goldwater's best state in the modern day "blue wall", which were states won by the Democrats in every presidential election from 1992 to 2012. Johnson was the only Democrat prior to 1992 to carry all of the states of that future "blue wall".

Results

Results by county

References

California
1964
1964 California elections